Xenodon rabdocephalus, commonly known as the false fer-de-lance, is a species of venomous rear-fanged snake in the family Colubridae. The species is native to Central America and northern South America. There are two recognized subspecies.

Geographic range
X. rabdocephalus is found in southern Mexico in the states of Guerrero, Veracruz, Yucatan and Campeche, through Guatemala, Belize, Honduras, El Salvador, Costa Rica and Panama. In northern South America it is found in Colombia, Venezuela, Guyana, Suriname, French Guiana, Ecuador, Peru, Bolivia and Brazil where it occurs in the states of Amapá, Rondônia, Pará, Espírito Santo and Bahia.

Habitat

Description
It is mainly brown with a series of brown and grey hourglass-shaped dorsal blotches on the body.

Diet
X. rabdocephalus feeds mainly on frogs and toads, including tadpoles.

Reproduction
X. rabdocephalus is oviparous.

Subspecies
Two subspecies are recognized as being valid, including the nominotypical subspecies.

X. r. rabdocephalus (Wied, 1824)
X. r. mexicanus H.M. Smith, 1940

Nota bene: A trinomial authority in parentheses indicates that the subspecies was originally described in a genus other than Xenodon.

References

Further reading
Boulenger GA (1894). Catalogue of the Snakes in the British Museum (Natural History). Volume II., Containing the Conclusion of the Colubridæ Aglyphæ. London: Trustees of the British Museum (Natural History). (Taylor and Francis, printers). xi + 382 pp. + Plates I-XX. (Xenodon colubrinus, pp. 146–147).
Freiberg M (1982). Snakes of South America. Hong Kong: T.F.H. Publications. 189 pp. . (Xenodon rabdocephalus, p. 113 + photo on p. 163).
Heimes P (2016). Snakes of Mexico: Herpetofauna Mexicana Vol. I. Frankfurt am Main, Germany: Edition Chimaira. 572 pp. .
Jan G, Sordelli F (1866). Iconographie générale des Ophidiens: Dix-neuvième livraison. Paris: J.-B. Baillière et Fils. Index + Plates I-VI. (Xenodon rhabdocephalus [sic] and X. bertholdi, Plate IV). (in French).
Smith HM (1940). "Descriptions of New Lizards and Snakes from Mexico and Guatemala". Proceedings of the Biological Society of Washington 53: 55-64. (Xenodon mexicanus, pp. 57–59).
Wied M (1824). "Verzeichniss der Amphibien, welche im zweyten Bande der Naturgeschichte Brasiliens vom Prinz Max von Neuwied werden beschreiben werden ". Isis von Oken 14: 661-673. (Coluber rabdocephalus, new species, p. 668). (in German).

Reptiles of Mexico
Reptiles of Central America
Reptiles described in 1824
Reptiles of South America
Reptiles of Colombia